is a former pornographic (AV) actress. She was born in Miyazaki Prefecture, she was formerly represented by T-Powers.

Personality
Her hobby is cleaning, and her special talents are playing volleyball and making creative cuisine. Having an interest in the entertainment world since childhood, while living in Osaka Prefecture she made her AV debut after being scouted there. She calls herself a "chippai actress" and touted her small bust as an appealing point. She frequently said she was limiting the period of her activity as an AV actress. There are various anecdotes regarding her career before her debut.

While a planning single actress or "Kikatan" (an AV actress not tied to any one production company), she broke through 100 appearances in January 2014, broke through 100 single appearances in October, and cast in 300 in December. While an exclusive actress (a popular AV actress signed to one company) in September 2015 she appeared in 200 works. Her total number of releases, including total compilations etc., were over 800 works (as of March 2016, from a search result of DMM.R 18)

After retirement as an AV actress, she has worked under the stage name .

Biography
She made her AV debut from Prestige in March 2013, holding her first photo session. On November, she won in the female department of the signboard model general election held at "Mirupoke" Kansai version.

In April 2014, she was nominated only for Kikatan actress at the DMM Adult Award Best Rookie Award, but did not win. In August, she won the 13th place in the sexy actress popularity vote which appeared as a character of Yakuza 0 and won the cast right. She participated in Japan Adult Expo in November. In the Weekly Asahi Geinō AV Grand Award 2014 Actress category, she won the Excellent Actress award along with Minami Kojima and Aika Yumeno. She held her first off-line party. In DM14.R18's annual AV actress ranking in 2014, she played the top 10 in all three sectors.

In February 2015, she joined Million Girls Z (Rika Hoshimi, Kizuna Sakura, Ayaka Tomoda, Ichika Ayamori, Anju Mizushima, hereafter MGZ). In March, in commemoration of Tsutaya Adult opening, she was inaugurated as monthly store manager with Chika Arimura, Saki Hatsumi, Ayaka Tomoda, and Rika Hoshimi. She later made her first appearance at a direct-to-video release. In April, she appeared at MGZ's first terrestrial regular programme (Kakkokari) TV. which started at Tokyo MX. She also appeared in the Shanghai AAE 2015 with Julia and Saki Kozai. She became an exclusive to Million on May. On July, MGZ made their major debut with "I ♥ MGZ". She appeared in a Shanghai event in August with Ai Uehara, Rola Misaki, and Kaede Fuyutsuki. She earned MVP at the Sky Perfect Swimming Tournament of the 1st Sexy Actress Darake! Million Girls Z later won Best Performance Award at the "Sexy Idol Music Festa 2015". In November, in the "MGZ Asia Tour 2015 'Hatsukoi'" in Guangzhou, Macau, China, in which the first single live performance of MGZ started. On December, she received the 2015 Promotion Award at the KMP Award held in Macau.

In February 2016, she graduated from the exclusive Million and returned to Kikatan actress. On March, she graduated from MGZ. She received the Cyzo Prize at Adult Broadcasting Awards 2016. And as she declared for a long time, she retired from the AV industry in three years. On April, she released a retirement memorial work. In May, although after retirement, she appeared in the column gravure of the monthly Cyzo 6th month of the Cyzo prize reception commemoration project. Although she was returning to civilian life, in December, she appeared in the name of yoshimi at "MGZ Last Gigs". In addition, under the invitation of the stage appearance, she appeared in the stage name Yoshimi Sakurai.

In January 2017, she received an offer for an overseas event, and participated in "Men's Show 2017 South Korea" under the name Ayu Sakurai.

Filmography

Television

 2014
OV Kantoku (21 Jul, CX) Co-stars: Nana Ninomiya, Kokoa Aisu
Buki wa TV. SMAP×FNS 27-jikan TV (27 Jul, CX)
Sanma Nakai no Konya mo Nemurenai: Zettai ni Honey Trap o Lakenai Sexy Joyū-san no Keitai Bangō o Getto shiyo! No Corner; Co-stars: Takuya Kimura, Daijiro Enami (Fuji TV announcer), Saki Hatsumi, Haruki Sato, Ayaka Tomoda, Iori Kogawa, Nao Mizuki, Nana Ninomiya, Chika Arimura
12th SkyPerfecTV! Presents Stop! AIDS Charity 24-Jikan TV Ero wa Chikyū o Sukuu! (30–31 Aug, BS Sky PerfecTV! Sky Channel 5)
Playboy Channel HD Ichioshi actress; Co-stars: Saki Hatsumi, Saki Miizumi, Hina Sakurasaku, Yu Shinoda, Kizuna Sakura, Miku Abeno, Nanami Kawakami, Marshmallow3D, Moe Kazama, Yui Fujishima, Mai Usami, Mei Hayama, Arina Sakita, Ami Unano, Nozomu Anaki, Sayumi Kojima, Yuri Sato

 2015
(Kakkokari) TV (7 Apr – 29 Sep, Tokyo MX1) Co-stars: Jungle Pocket, Kokomi Naruse, MGZ
BS SkyPerfecTV! Purimen & Sexy Joyū datte Chikyū o Sukutchau zo! 5-Jikan SP (22 Aug, BS Sky PerfecTV!)
1st Sexy actress Darake! SKY PerfecTV! Swimming Competition Part 2*kmp Channel representative; Co-stars: Miku Abeno, Nana Ayano, Mai Usami, Mio Kimio, Saki Kosai, Minami Kojima, Ayane Ryokawa, Saki Hatsumi, Mayu Minami, etc.
Sexy-J Summer Festival (5 Sep, Enta!579) Co-stars: Minami Kojima, Mana Sakura, Rina Rukawa, Marina Shiraishi, Moe Tenshi, Erina Nagasawa, Riri Kuribayashi, Kaho Shibuya, Ayumi Kimito, Saki Kosai, Miki Sunohara, Tsubasa Amami, Shunhate Ayami, Yuko Shiraki, Ryomi Yamatohime, Kühn, Marshmallow3D+, me-me*, MGZ, Mihiro
Summers no Kamigitoi (21 Nov, CX) Co-stars: Yume Ayanami, Mai Uchiyama, Ruka Kanae, Erika Kitagawa, Iori Kogawa, Yuki Kami, Miki Sunohara, Nanako Tsukishima, Rika Hoshimi
Moteru no Hōsoku (4 Dec, Nagoya TV Next) season4 #3; Co-star: Harumi Tachibana
Sweet Angel (4 Dec, Mondo TV) #61
13th SkyPerfecTV! Presents Stop! AIDS Charity 24-Jikan TV Ero wa Chikyū o Sukuu! Ai tte, Gamanda.
Oppai o Minai oppai Bokin Co-stars: Nanako Tsukushima, Ayumi Shinoda
Namade Paipai moma sete (5–6 Dec, BS SkyPerfecTV! Sky Channel 5) Co-stars: Kunihiro Matsumura, Yamazaki Motors, Doborokku, Mana Sakura, Miori Hara, Mai Tamaki, Miho Torino, Mai Miori, Yume Ayanami, Nana Ayano, Shinobu Igarashi, Natsuko Kayama, Hina Kinami, Minami Kojima, Hikaru Konno, Ayane Ryokawa, Iroha Narumiya, Saki Hatsumi, Mao Hamasaki, China Matsuoka, Saki Miizumi, Kana Yua*Appeared as an Adult Broadcasting Award 2016 Nomination Actress
Sexy Idol Music Festa 2015 (7, 9 Dec, Nagoya TV Next) Co-stars: Aki Yoshizawa, Stylish Heart, SIMF2015 Opening Member, Lovely Pops, Kühn, Shinsei Pinkey, MGZ, etc.

 2016
12th Adult Broadcasting Awards (8 Mar, BS Sky PerfecTV!)
Adult Broadcasting Awards 2016: Kandō no Butaiura mo Dai Kōkai! (17 Mar, Enta!959)

Internet

※Including paid sites.
Peach Movie
Ane One Style
Get Movie
Nylon
Panty Stocking Play Video "Pantyhose Leg Blame"
520 (5 May 2014)
521 (7 May 2014)
522 (9 May 2014)
Panty stocking image videos
377 (5 Sep 2014)
379 (12 Sep 2014)
DMM.R18 Live Chat (20 Jul 2014 – 30 Mar 2015)
SMM Live Chat (28 Nov 2014)
Kindan Girl (22 Mar (21 at midnight) 2015 – 7 Feb (6 at midnight), NotTV) #76, 77, 83, 87, 91, 117, 119, 120
Hige Danshaku Rui Yamada 53-sei no Renaissance Studio (delivered Sep 2015, Feb 2016, Bunkahōsō Podcast) SkyPerfecTV corner
Hakase Suidobashi no Mura tto bin bin TV (26 Feb 2016, J:Com on Demand) #6; Co-stars: Hakase Suidobashi, Shimiken
Kanzen Mi Kōkai! Ayu Sakurai to Ayaka Tomoda no W Ingo Dekoki XCity 20-shūnen omedetō Comment-tsuki (2 May 2016, XCity) Co-star: Ayaka Tomoda

Ones Factory presents
Gekkan Asakura Yū TV (2 Aug 2014)
Momoiro Rotary Club Banana Tsūshin (7 May – 19 Jun 2014) #9, #13 Co-stars: Kokomi Sakura, Nana Ninomiya, Iori Kogawa
Moodyz presents
Dai 3-kai Bakobasu Chūkei 12-jikan SP (15 May 2014)
[Day 2] Adult Expo Booth Nama Chūkei (15 Nov)
FS.Knights Visual Jake to Nama Chūkei (4 Dec)
MC Kaji (5 Feb 2015 – 4 Mar 2016) Co-stars: Kaji, Ayaka Tomoda, Nanami Hirose, etc.
(AV Open 2015) Kaisai Kinen SP #2 (27 Aug) Co-stars: Ayaka Tomoda, Yume Ayanami
[Guest wa Ayu Sakurai-san] Pachinko Slot Renai Simulation Sasutona! [Jissen Hito no Tonari wa Deru ka Uwasa o Kenshō] (28 Sep)
Toy's Heart Presents Kinō Dare Tabeta? (4 Nov) #51

Stage
Mukenjigoku -Maboroshi no Kumo no Ito- (21–25 Dec 2016, Gekidan Full Monty) as "Shiki"
Take (26 Feb 2017, Teratolock) guest appearance
199X-toshi (5–8 May, Teratolock) as "Surge"
BPMD (18–22 Oct, High Spex Tracks Kikaku) as "Mao"
Box-Sing –3Round– (26, 28 Oct, High Spex Tracks Kikaku) guest appearance
Box-Sing Kansha-sai –Dream Match– (postponed, High Spex Tracks Kikaku)

Video game 

 Yakuza 0 (2015) as Ayu, a timid young woman aspiring to become a dominatrix

References

External links
 (31 Aug 2016 –) – TwitCasting 

 As "Ayu Sakurai"
 – TwitCasting 
Ayu Sakurai – allcinema 
Ayu Sakurai – Kinenote 
Ayu Sakurai – Oricon 
 (6 Mar – 18 Jul) – TwitCasting 
 (29 Mar 2013 – 25 Mar 2014) 
 (23 Apr – 7 Jun 2013) 

Japanese pornographic film actresses
People from Miyazaki Prefecture
1991 births
Living people